Bad Lauterberg is a town in the district of Göttingen, in Lower Saxony, Germany. It is situated in the southern Harz, approx. 15 km southwest of Braunlage, and 20 km southeast of Osterode am Harz.

Bad Lauterberg is known inter alia for the liqueurs, Schierker Feuerstein and Harzer Grubenlicht, which are both manufactured and bottled here.

Bad Lauterberg was the birthplace (1879) of the Polar explorer Alfred Ritscher.

Politics

Town council

Town Council after the local elections on September 11, 2016: 
CDU: 6 seats
Wählergruppe: 5 seats
SPD: 5 seats
BI: 2 seats
Bündnis 90/Die Grünen: 1 seats
NPD: 1 seat

Sights 
About a mile east of the town in the mountains is the viewing point of Hohe Tür which is by a mountain lake and on the main Weser-Elbe watershed. It is checkpoint 43 in the Harzer Wandernadel hiking network.

Notable people

 Alfred Ritscher (1879-1963), captain and Arctic explorer
 Eberhard Umbach (born 1948), German physicist and science manager
 Bibiana Steinhaus (born 1979), football referee 
 Tino Schmidt (born 1993), football player

See also
 Osterhagen

References

External links 

Towns in Lower Saxony
Towns in the Harz
Spa towns in Germany